Actinia is a genus of sea anemones in the family Actiniidae. Actinia display a rare form of heteromorphosis in which a cut inflicted on a specimen can develop into a second mouth.

Species
The following species are listed in the World Register of Marine Species (WoRMS):

Actinia alba Risso, 1826
Actinia annulata Gay, 1854
Actinia aster Ellis, 1768
Actinia australiensis Carlgren, 1950
Actinia bermudensis (McMurrich, 1889)
Actinia bicornis Müller, 1776
Actinia capillata Gay, 1854
Actinia cari Delle Chiaje, 1822
Actinia chlorodactyla Brandt, 1835
Actinia cinerea Gay, 1854
Actinia cleopatrae Hemprich & Ehrenberg, 1834
Actinia curta Drayton in Dana, 1846
Actinia delicatula (Hertwig, 1888)
Actinia dubia Lesson, 1830
Actinia ebhayiensis Schama, Mitchell & Solé-Cava, 2011
Beadlet anemone (Actinia equina (Linnaeus, 1758))
Actinia erythrospilota Brandt, 1835
Actinia fiscella Müller, 1789
Actinia fragacea Tugwell, 1856, Strawberry anemone
Actinia gelatinosa Moseley, 1877
Actinia gemma Drayton in Dana, 1846
Actinia gracilis Hemprich & Ehrenberg, 1834
Actinia graminea Drayton in Dana, 1846
Actinia grobbeni Watzl, 1922
Actinia iris Müller, 1789
Actinia kraemeri Pax, 1914
Actinia laurentii Brandt, 1835
Actinia mamillaris Quoy & Gaimard, 1833
Actinia mediterranea Schmidt, 1971
Actinia mertensii Brandt, 1835
Actinia minutissima Le Sueur, 1817
Actinia mucilaginosa
Actinia nigropunctata den Hartog & Ocaña, 2003
Actinia obtruncata Stimpson, 1853
Actinia ostraearum Gay, 1854
Actinia papuana Quoy & Gaimard, 1833
Actinia prasina Gosse, 1860
Actinia punctata Gay, 1854
Actinia pusilla Swartz, 1788
Actinia reclinata Bosc, 1802
Actinia rosea Risso, 1826
Actinia rosula Ehrenberg, 1834
Actinia rubida Holdsworth, 1855
Actinia rufa Müller, 1776
Actinia sali Monteiro, Sole-Cava & Thorpe, 1997
Actinia sanguineo-punctata Templeton, 1841
Actinia simplex Ehrenberg, 1834
Actinia sinensis Andres, 1883
Actinia striata Quoy & Gaimard, 1833
Actinia striata Rizzi, 1907
Actinia strigata Quoy & Gaimard, 1833
Actinia tabella Drayton in Dana, 1846
Actinia taeniata Gay, 1854
Actinia tenebrosa Farquhar, 1898
Actinia tilesii Milne Edwards, 1857
Actinia timida Verrill, 1868
Actinia tongana Quoy & Gaimard, 1833
Actinia truncata Müller, 1776
Actinia varians Müller, 1806
Actinia violacea Risso, 1826
Actinia volva Müller, 1776
Actinia zonata Rathke, 1836

References

Actiniidae
Hexacorallia genera
Taxa named by Carl Linnaeus